A list of notable flat horse races which take place annually in Canada and which currently hold Grade 1, 2 or 3 according to the Jockey Club of Canada.

Grade 1

Grade 2

Grade 3

Canadian Triple Crown races

References

Horse racing in Canada
Horse racing-related lists